is a railway station on the Jōban Line in the city of Iwaki, Fukushima, Japan, operated by East Japan Railway Company (JR East). The station also has a freight depot for the Fukushima Rinkai Railway Main Line.

Lines
Izumi Station is served by the Jōban Line, and is located 195.0 km from the official starting point of the line at

Station layout
Izumi Station has one island platform and one side platform connected to the station building by a footbridge. The station has a Midori no Madoguchi staffed ticket office.

Platforms

History
Izumi Station opened on 25 February 1897. The station was absorbed into the JR East network upon the privatization of the Japanese National Railways (JNR) on 1 April 1987.

Passenger statistics
In fiscal 2018, the station was used by an average of 2449 passengers daily (boarding passengers only).

Surrounding area
Iwaki-Izumi Post Office
Onahama Port
Aquamarine Fukushima

See also
 List of railway stations in Japan

References

External links

  

Stations of East Japan Railway Company
Railway stations in Fukushima Prefecture
Jōban Line
Railway stations in Japan opened in 1897
Iwaki, Fukushima